The Merkit (literally "skillful/wise ones") was one of the five major tribal confederations (khanlig) of probably Mongol or Turkic origin. in the 12th century Mongolian Plateau.

The Merkits lived in the basins of the Selenga and lower Orkhon River (modern south Buryatia and Selenge Province). After a struggle of over 20 years, they were defeated in 1200 by Genghis Khan and were incorporated into the Mongol Empire.

Etymology 
The word Merged (мэргэд) is a plural form derived from the Mongolian word mergen (мэргэн), which means both "wise" and "skillful marksperson", as in adept in the use of bow and arrow. The word is also used in many phrases in which it connotes magic, oracles, divination, augury, or religious power. Mongolian language has no clear morphological or grammatical distinction between nouns and adjectives, so mergen may mean "a sage" as much as "wise" or mean "skillful" just as much as "a master." Merged becomes plural as in "wise ones" or "skillful markspeople". In the general sense, mergen usually denotes someone who is skillful and wise in their affairs.

Three Mergeds 
The Mergeds were a confederation of three tribes, inhabiting the basin of the Selenga and Orkhon Rivers.
 The Uduyid Merkits lived in Buur-kheer, near the lower Orkhon River;
 The Uvas Merkits lived in Tar, between the Orkhon and Selenge Rivers;
 The Khaad Merkits ("Kings" Merkits) lived in Kharaji-kheer, on the Selenge River.

Ethnic relations 
The Merkits were related to the Mongols, Naimans, Keraites, and Khitan people.

Conflict with Genghis Khan 
Temüjin's mother Hoelun, originally from the Olkhonud, had been engaged to the Merkit chief Yehe Chiledu by 1153. She was abducted by Temüjin's father Yesugei, while being escorted home by Yehe Chiledu.

In turn, Temüjin's new wife Börte was kidnapped by Merkit raiders from their campsite by the Onon river around 1181 and given to one of their warriors. Temüjin, supported by his brother (not blood-related) Jamukha and his khan etseg ('khan father') Tooril Khan of the Keraites, attacked the Merkit and rescued Börte within the year. The Mergids were dispersed after this attack. Shortly thereafter she gave birth to a son named Jochi. Temüjin accepted paternity but the question lingered throughout Jochi's life. These incidents caused a strong animosity between Temüjin's family and the Merkits. From 1191 to 1207, Temujin fought the Merkits five times.

By the time he had united the other Mongol tribes and received the title Genghis Khan in 1206, the Mergids seem to have disappeared as an ethnic group. Those who survived were likely absorbed by other Mongol tribes (Oirats, Buryats, Khalkhas) and others who fled to the Kipchaks mixed with them. In 1215–1218, Jochi and Subutai crushed the remnants of them under their former leader Toghta Beki's family. The Mongols clashed with the Kankalis or the Kipchaks because they had sheltered the Merged.

Genghis Khan had a Merged khatun (queen) named Khulan. She died while Mongol forces besieged Ryazan in 1236. In 1236, during the Mongol invasion of Volga Bulgaria, a body of the Merkit was found in the area of land dominated by the Bulgar and Kipchak.

Late Mergeds 
A few Mergeds achieved prominent position among the Mongols, but they were classified as Mongols in Mongolian society. Great Khan Guyuk's beloved khatun Oghul Qaimish, who was a regent from 1248–1251, was a Merged woman. The traditionalist Bayan and his nephew Toqto'a served as grand chancellors of the Yuan dynasty. After the fall of the Yuan dynasty, they were a clan of a banner in the Northern Yuan dynasty.

Notes

References 

Mongol peoples
Nomadic groups in Eurasia
11th-century establishments in Asia
1200s disestablishments in Asia
Former confederations
Former monarchies